Salama Hegazi  born 1852, died October 4, 1917 was an Egyptian singer. He was a pioneer of musical theatre in Egypt in the first half of the 20th century.

Born Salama Ibrahim Hegazi, he was locally known as El Sheikh Salama. In 1852 in Alexandria, he recited the Qur'an, after memorising the entire book.

Many famous singers in Egypt, such as Munira Mahdia and Mohamed Abdel Wahab, have sung his music. He promoted Sayed Darwish, who considered him an inspiration.

Iskandar Farah and Salama founded a theater company in 1891.

In 1914, with George Abiad, he helped in the formation of a new group and they worked together until his death, despite being paralyzed at the end of his days he continued to appear on stage. He has been credited with many forms of musical theatre and operetta music.

Notable work 
With Iskandar Farah:
African
Talimak
Ataiwaq
King of the reservoirs.
Solo: 
Saladin
With George Abiad: 
Egypt
The Heart of a Woman
Al-Hakim bi-Amr Allah
To the Homeland
Criminal Innocent

References

External links 
Al-Ahram Weekly: "The heritage of sound"

1852 births
1917 deaths
People from Alexandria
Egyptian nationalists
Egyptian composers
20th-century Egyptian male singers
Egyptian oud players
19th-century Egyptian male singers